LOLC Finance PLC is a non-banking financial company based in Sri Lanka. LOLC Holdings is the ultimate parent company of LOLC Finance. The company was founded as LOLC Finance Company Limited in 2001. In 2003, the company changed its name to Lanka ORIX Finance Company and commenced operations. Lanka ORIX Finance Company became a public company in 2011 with its listing on the Colombo Stock Exchange. The company adopted its current name in 2015. LOLC Finance is one of the LMD 100 companies in Sri Lanka. The company is also one of the 100 most valuable brands in the country. LOLC Finance has been a constituent of the S&P Sri Lanka 20 Index since the end of 2021. LOLC Finance merged with its sister company, Commercial Leasing & Finance PLC in 2022. The merger resulted in LOLC Finance becoming the largest non-banking financial company in the country.

History
The company was incorporated in 2001 as LOLC Finance Company Limited. LOLC Finance Company obtained a licence from the Central Bank of Sri Lanka as a finance company in the following year. The company changed its name to Lanka Orix Finance Company Limited and commenced operations in 2003. The company launched its Shariah-compliant banking unit LOLC Al-Falaah in 2008. Lanka Orix Finance Company was listed on the Colombo Stock Exchange on 7 July 2011. Lanka ORIX Leasing Company sold 10% of its stake in the company and was listed on the Diri Savi Board of the stock exchange.

The Central Bank of Sri Lanka introduced its consolidation "Master Plan" of the financial sector in 2014. Under the consolidation plan, the larger non-bank financial companies were encouraged to acquire smaller companies. The Central Bank informed the LOLC Group that the group could not continue with more than two 'A' category financial companies. The LOLC Group planned to merge Lanka ORIX Finance Company with the group's microfinance firm, LOLC Micro Credit Limited. The company joined the electronic fund transfer network LankaPay in 2015. Lanka ORIX Finance changed its name to LOLC Finance at the end of 2015. The proposed merger of LOLC Finance and LOLC Micro Credit realised in 2018.

Operations
LOLC Finance was ranked 49th in the LMD 100 list in 2023. It was a 15-place drop for LOLC Finance from the last year. LMD 100 lists public companies in Sri Lanka by revenue annually. LOLC Finance is one of the 100 most valuable brands in Sri Lanka. Brand Finance has estimated the brand value of LOLC Finance to be LKR7,031 million and ranked the company 20th in its 2022 annual rankings. LOLC Finance was included in the S&P Sri Lanka 20 Index at the 2021 yearend index rebalance. In January 2022, LOLC Finance merged with its sister company, Commercial Leasing & Finance. Before the merger, Commercial Leasing acquired and merged with Sinhaputhra Finance PLC. The merger resulted in LOLC Finance becoming the largest non-banking financial company in the country. The shareholders of LOLC Development Finance, another fellow subsidiary of LOLC Finance, approved the resolution of the amalgamation of LOLC Development Finance with LOLC Finance.

Finances

Source: Annual Report, 2021/22 (pp. 165–166)

See also
 List of companies listed on the Colombo Stock Exchange
 List of Sri Lankan public corporations by market capitalisation

References

External links
 

2001 establishments in Sri Lanka
Companies listed on the Colombo Stock Exchange
Financial services companies of Sri Lanka
Financial services companies established in 2001